Zoom fatigue is tiredness, worry, or burnout associated with the overuse of online platforms of communication, particularly videotelephony. The name derives from the cloud based videoconferencing and online chat software Zoom, but the term can be used to refer to fatigue from other video conferencing platforms (such as Google Meet, Microsoft Teams, or Skype).

The term was popularized during the COVID-19 pandemic, in which the use of videoconferencing software became common due to the effects of isolation and widespread lockdowns.

The phenomenon of Zoom fatigue has been attributed to an overload of nonverbal cues and communication that does not happen in normal conversation and the increased average size of groups in video calls.

Symptoms

Physical 
While remote work was dependent on the software services and information technology sectors, the COVID-19 pandemic forced more than 85% of other services and sectors to adopt remote work. This novel concept of working from home (WFH) for other sectors opened up new challenges among households, such as lack of dedicated workspace or multiple remote workers in a family.

A study by the Institute for Employment Studies (IES) conducted during the first two weeks of the COVID-19 lockdowns found that more than half of the survey respondents reported new aches and pains, especially in the neck (58%), shoulder (56%) and back (55%), compared to their normal condition. The study also found that poor sleep and increased risk of exhaustion were also cause for concern. The majority of respondents reported a loss of sleep due to worry (64%) and corresponding increased symptoms of fatigue (60%), which the IES attributed to be "possibly [as] a consequence of nearly half (48%) reporting working patterns that include long and irregular hours." Increase in alcohol consumption, eating a less healthy diet and poor sleep were other causes of concern.

A survey with over one thousand Americans in November 2020 found that 72% of the surveyed people were working from their bed. This habit triggered health problems, particularly in young workers and students aged 18 to 34. Some problems attributed to working from bed were limited headaches or prolonged to permanent stiffness in the back, arthritis and cervical pain.

Psychological 
In a video call, minds are together, but bodies are not; this cognitive dissonance causes conflictual feelings which are exhausting. This conflict is due to the fact that users are connected virtually but they do not share the same space physically. Gianpiero Petriglieri, an associate professor with INSEAD, suggests Zoom fatigue comes about as a result of people having to pay more attention to non-verbal cues such as pitch and tone of voice, facial expressions and body language, a process that requires the mind to work much harder than it would need to in a face-to-face setting. Participants use high levels of cognitive energy in order to recognize non-verbal cues which are difficult to visualize because the environment is not shared. In addition, the short delay experienced when relaying video calls also creates a negative impression of others, even if it is minimal, it makes people perceiving the responder as less friendly and focused. Moreover, while in face-to-face communication silence gives natural rhythm to the conversation, in a video call the silence generates anxiety.

Marissa Shuffler, an associate professor at Clemson University, argues that people have a greater awareness of being watched when on camera, and can feel a greater sense of self-awareness by seeing their own image: "When you're on a video conference, you know everybody's looking at you; you are on stage, so there comes the social pressure and feeling like you need to perform. Being performative is nerve-wracking and more stressful". The human brain perceives threat from the presence of an enlarged face in private spaces such as the home.

Contextual 
The emergence of Zoom fatigue is associated with COVID-19 pandemic that together with the limitation of social contacts have led people to change their habits.  The inability to cope with the new technologies is called Technostress. Indeed, the digital divide theory highlights that there are global differences in the access and use of digital technologies. For example, distance education is more difficult for students located in rural areas where connection problems are frequent. For all these reasons, during online live sessions, it has been challenging to maintain a good level of concentration and keep high rates of cognitive energy.

Consequences 
The most relevant consequences of Zoom fatigue that need to be pointed out are physical and emotional.

Physical 
The most important and serious physical consequences of Zoom fatigue affect eyes, shoulder (provoking stiffness in the back), articulations (generating arthritis) and cervical. Headaches, migraines, eye irritation and pain, blurred and double vision, excessive tearing and blinking are the most common and immediately visible physical symptoms of Zoom fatigue.
Beyond these, there are other consequences affecting the body from a mental point of view that, even if they are less evident they are the most problematic because they can affect the body for a long-term period, they are also difficult to diagnose and consequently to treat. Some of them are decreased attention, sleep disorders, depression, depletion of mental or physical capacity and inertia.

Emotional 
Emotional consequences of Zoom fatigue are fundamental to consider since they have great importance in an individual's approach with social relations and with the work environment.

Among them, it is possible to list:

 Emotional exhaustion, a long lasting and chronic feeling. Energy use during a Zoom call is higher, people are unable to recover and re-energize in their free time, thus permanently experiencing exhaustion.
 Depletion, the lack of motivation mirrored in the unwillingness to engage in many different tasks that require effort and self-control.
 The tech invasion, that refers to the intrusion of technology into every aspect of life that, generating the feeling to be constantly connected, provokes discomfort to individuals

Shift to digital consumption 
Before the COVID-19 pandemic, communication through a variety of digital means had become increasingly common, in addition to typical physical interactions. This changed dramatically as lockdowns began and standard social practices became restricted, skyrocketing the digital landscape to the forefront of communication.  As a result, institutions and individuals were forced to quickly adapt to virtual interactions in place of physical ones, culminating in the overuse of videoconferencing platforms.

Increased usage of videoconferencing platforms 
Suddenly, technology became the most important asset and Zoom, and other video conferencing platforms saw a meteoric rise. Zoom, previously little-known software, earned its place as a dominant player reporting 300 million daily meeting participants, went from a total of 10 million daily meeting participants in December 2019 to 300 million in April 2020. Microsoft Teams announced in April 2020, it had 75 million daily active users, a jump from 70 percent in a month. Microsoft also recorded 200 million meeting participants in a single day the same month. Another important player is Google Meet, which added roughly 3 million new users each day, hitting over 100 million daily Meet meeting participants. In the same month, Cisco also revealed that it had a total of 300 million Webex users and saw sign-ups close to 240,000 in a 24-hour period.

Increased multifunctionality of videoconferencing platforms 
Traditionally, many people use these platforms in a more conventional way, like business calls or to stay connected with family and friends, however, there was an increasing number of creative use cases, thanks to the availability of different devices and software solutions. In this regard, video calls enhance the sense of togetherness by facilitating the sharing of daily routines. For example, couples tend to leave the video on while doing other activities and interact occasionally with the other partner or children who want to "show and tell" at the same time, since the communication with video calls is more natural than voice or text.
Families and friends started celebrating holidays online, such as Easter and the Passover Seder, or simply watch a movie, play games or celebrate birthdays. Some physically oriented activities that are related to social life or personal interests have also become virtual, like holding church services or yoga classes in an online format.
People actively participated in webinars to get psychological support, career or health counseling, and so on, was a way to deal with the COVID-19 crisis.

State of research 
The growing public concern about causes and consequences of Zoom fatigue during the COVID-19 pandemic is reflected in intensive media reporting. At the same time, researchers have been starting to investigate the phenomenon of Zoom fatigue by suggesting underlying psychological mechanisms, developing measures such as the "Zoom Exhaustion & Fatigue Scale" and conducting empirical studies. Also, review papers that summarize and structure the current scientific knowledge on videoconference fatigue are available.

See also 
 Zoom
 Microsoft Teams
 Distance education
 Cognitive dissonance
 Coronavirus disease 2019
 Technostress
 Web conferencing
 Proximity chat

References 

Subjective experience
Symptoms
Videotelephony
2020 neologisms
Social impact of the COVID-19 pandemic
Zoom (software)